Crassispira maonisriparum is an extinct species of sea snail, a marine gastropod mollusk in the family Pseudomelatomidae, the turrids and allies.

Description
The length of the shell attains 9.5 mm, its diameter 4 mm.

Distribution
Fossils have been found in Miocene strata of the Dominican Republic and Venezuela: age range: 11.608 to 7.246 Ma.

References

 C. J. Maury. 1917. Santo Domingo type sections and fossils. Bulletins of American Paleontology 5(30):1-43
 M. C. Perrilliat and P. Flores-Guerrero. 2011. Moluscos de la Formación Agueguexquite (Plioceno inferior) de Coatzacoalcos, Veracruz, México. Revista Mexicana de Ciencias Geológicas 28(3):379-397

maonisriparum
Gastropods described in 1917